Shabanlu (also Romanized as Sha‘bānlū) is a village in, and the capital of, Marhemetabad-e Shomali Rural District of the Central District of Chaharborj County, West Azerbaijan province, Iran. At the 2006 National Census, its population was 1,473 in 338 households, when it was in the former Marhemetabad District of Miandoab County. The following census in 2011 counted 2,000 people in 552 households. The latest census in 2016 showed a population of 2,064 people in 614 households. Marhemetabad District was separated from Miandoab County, elevated to the status of Chaharborj County, and divided into two districts in 2020.

References 

Populated places in West Azerbaijan Province